U62 or U-62 may refer to:

 UHF (film), fictional television station used in the "Weird Al" Yankovic film
 Channel 62 (disambiguation)
 , which may refer to one of several German submarines.